A penumbral lunar eclipse took place on 24–25 May 2013, the second of three lunar eclipses in 2013. It was visually imperceptible due to the small entry into the penumbral shadow.

This event marked the beginning of Saros series 150.

Visibility

A simulated view of the earth from the center of the moon at maximal eclipse.

Map

Gallery

Related eclipses

Eclipses of 2013 
 A partial lunar eclipse on 25 April.
 An annular solar eclipse on 10 May.
 A penumbral lunar eclipse on 25 May.
 A penumbral lunar eclipse on 18 October.
 A hybrid solar eclipse on 3 November.

Lunar year (354 days)
This eclipse is the one of five lunar eclipses in a short-lived series. The lunar year series repeats after 12 lunations or 354 days (Shifting back about 10 days in sequential years). Because of the date shift, the Earth's shadow will be about 11 degrees west in sequential events.

Saros series
This is the first lunar eclipse of Saros series 150. The next occurrence will also be a penumbral eclipse on 5 June 2031. Solar Saros 157 interleaves with this lunar saros with an event occurring every 9 years 5 days alternating between each saros series.

Partial eclipses in series 150 will occur between 20 August 2157 and past the year 3000. Total eclipses will occur between 29 April 2572 and 28 August 2770.

See also
List of lunar eclipses and List of 21st-century lunar eclipses
:File:Penumbral eclipse of May 25, 2013 from lunar south pole.gif Animation of earth as seen from lunar south pole during the eclipse.

Notes and references

External links

2013-05